Demetrios Farmakopoulos, (Δημήτριος Φαρμακόπουλος),(1919–1996), also known as Mimis Farmakopoulos.  An influential Greek painter whose main recurring theme is space and the future.

Introduction
Born in Athens, in 1919 and graduated from the Athens School of Fine Arts winning first prize in nude paintings.

During World War II, Farmakopoulos served in the Greek Army and later joined the group EAM during the Greek Resistance against the occupation of Greece by Nazi Germany.

Since then, Farmakopoulos had a great artistic career and numerous exhibitions in Greece and in South America, especially Brazil where he spent a number of years.

His main theme is celestial phenomena, space and the distant future.

During his stay in Brazil, he studied at the Academy of Fine Arts of Rio de Janeiro where he took courses in Interior Design and Stagecraft.  Thereafter he was the head set designer for many years in television, dance halls and Brazilian Carnivals.

Exhibitions
1949   Zappeion - Panhellenic Exhibition of Greek Crafts - Athens, Greece
1952   Outdoor Exhibition - Kifisia, Greece
1957   Salao Nacional de Belas Artes - Rio de Janeiro, Brazil
1958   Salao do Mar - Rio de Janeiro, Brazil
1958   Museu Arte Monterna - Em Goiania - Brazil
1959   Coletiva do Turismo - Rio de Janeiro, Brazil
1960   Α.Σ.Μ. - Rio de Janeiro, Brazil
1961   "Toca" Galeri - Rio de Janeiro, Brazil
1962   "Toca" Galeri - Rio de Janeiro, Brazil
1963   Instituto Brasil-USA - Brazil
1964   Casueiruem - Vitoria, Brazil
1966   Salao Nacional E.S. - Vitoria, Brazil
1967   Salao Nacional E.S. - Vitoria, Brazil
1967   Museu Arte Monterna - Rio de Janeiro, Brazil
1969   Galeri "Sao Sermain" - Rio de Janeiro, Brazil
1969   Galeri "Rico Rico" - Rio de Janeiro, Brazil
1970   Transantlantic ship "Augusto" - en route
1971   Piraeus Carnival - Greece
1972   Rotonda - Athens, Greece
1973   Center of Cultural Cooperation - Athens, Greece
1973   Panhellenic Exhibition - Athens, Greece
1974   New Thought - Athens, Greece
1974   Center of Cultural Cooperation - Athens, Greece
1975   Panhellenic Exhibition - Athens, Greece
1975   New Thought - Athens, Greece
1975   Ministry of Culture - Week of Art - Athens, Greece
1976   New Thought - Athens, Greece
1976   EPASKT - Athens, Greece
1977   "Dawn" Festival - Athens, Greece
1978   Firka Museum - Panhellenic Painting Exhibition - Chania, Greece
1978   Athens Cultural Center - 2001 - Athens, Greece
1979   O.S.E. - Athens, Greece
1980   Gallery "Simvoli" - Athens, Greece
1980   Gallery "Modern Art Team" - Athens, Greece
1980   KNE Festival - Peristeri, Greece
1981   Cooperative of Artists - Athens, Greece
1981   Patissia Artists - Civilizing Movement - Athens, Greece
1986   Athens, Greece
1998   Gallery "Artbus" - Chalandri, Greece
2002   Gallery "Antinor" - Athens, Greece

Sources
"Messages from Space" - 2002

1919 births
1996 deaths
Greek painters
Contemporary painters
Burials at the First Cemetery of Athens
Greek expatriates in Brazil
Artists from Athens